The following highways in Virginia have been known as State Route 15:
 State Route 15 (Virginia 1918–1923), the portion of State Route 59 (Virginia 1940-1949) from West Virginia to Woodstock, Virginia
 State Route 15 (Virginia 1923–1933), now U.S. Route 52 in Virginia and Virginia State Route 121 from North Carolina to Max Meadows, Virginia
 U.S. Route 15 (Virginia), 1926–present